Derrick Crudup (born February 15, 1965) is a former American football defensive back and running back. He played for the Los Angeles Raiders in 1989 and 1991.

References

1965 births
Living people
American football defensive backs
American football running backs
Florida Gators football players
Oklahoma Sooners football players
Los Angeles Raiders players
Boca Raton Community High School alumni